Olle Håkansson (born 14 September 1956 in Sundsvall) is a former Swedish curler and curling coach.

He is an author of several books.

Teams

Record as a coach of national teams

References

External links

Wayne åker till Costa del Sol - Olle Håkansson - böcker (9789188809711) | Adlibris Bokhandel
Wayne går på casino - Olle Håkansson - böcker (9789163910579) | Adlibris Bokhandel

Living people
1956 births
People from Sundsvall
Swedish male curlers
European curling champions
Swedish curling champions
Swedish curling coaches
Sportspeople from Västernorrland County
20th-century Swedish people